Krymske is a village in Shchastia Raion (district) in Luhansk Oblast of eastern Ukraine, at about 50 km NW from the centre of Luhansk city.

The village is situated on the right bank of the Siverskyi Donets. In the current War in Donbass the village was liberated from  separatist control on 20 October 2014. Since then the village is regularly shelled by forces loyal to the Luhansk People's Republic. Two Ukrainian servicemen were killed and another two were wounded in a skirmish between the warring parties that took place at Krymske on 28 July 2018.

Four Ukrainian servicemen were killed and six others were wounded in a 3-hour skirmish that started on 23 August 2018 at around 6:00 am. On February 18, 2020, Russian-backed separatists launched an attack near Krymske, attempting to overrun an entrenched Ukrainian position, in the first such attack in two years. The attack killed one Ukrainian soldier, and injured four others.

Demographics
Native language as of the Ukrainian Census of 2001:
 Ukrainian 87.48%
 Russian 12.52%

References

External links
  Weather forecast for Krymske
Shchastia Raion
Slavyanoserbsky Uyezd

Villages in Shchastia Raion
Populated places established in 1725